The Railway Workers' Union is the name of:

 General Railway Workers' Union, former trade union in the United Kingdom
 Indonesian Railways Workers' Union, trade union in Indonesia
 Korean Railway Workers' Union, trade union in South Korea
 National Railway Workers' Union, trade union in Japan
 Railway Workers' Union (Austria), former trade union in Austria
 Railway Workers' Union (Finland), former trade union in Finland
 Railway Workers' Union (Ghana), trade union Ghana
 Railway Workers Union (Iraq), former trade union in Iraq
 Railway Workers' Union (Pakistan), trade union in Pakistan
 Rhodesian Railway Workers' Union, former trade union in Rhodesia